Shpat is a village in the former municipality of Paskuqan in Tirana County, Albania. At the 2015 local government reform it became part of the municipality Kamëz.

References

Populated places in Kamëz
Villages in Tirana County